María Larraín de Vicuña (? – 23 September 1928, Santiago, Chile) was a writer and activist in the nascent Chilean feminist movement in the early twentieth century.

A member of the Pontifical Catholic University of Chile's Academia de Bellas Letras, she campaigned for women's civil and political rights in Chile by establishing several women's organizations and writing various Christian feminist articles between 1915 and 1928, which were compiled and published posthumously in the book María Larraín de Vicuña: 23 de septiembre de 1928.

References 

Chilean women writers
Pontifical Catholic University of Chile alumni
1928 deaths
Year of birth missing
Chilean feminist writers
Catholic feminists